Civitas Social Housing is a large British investment trust dedicated to investments in existing portfolios of built social homes in England and Wales. Established in 2016, the company is listed on the London Stock Exchange. The Chairman is Michael Wrobel. 

It is the largest social housing real estate investment trust, working with 15 housing associations. The Regulator of Social Housing has challenged the business model of some of its providers where rent income from housing benefit payments is less than lease expenditure. 

In October 2021, the company promised proper disclosure about property transactions after criticism that it had failed to adequately disclose the fact that its fund managers were significant shareholders in companies from which the company had bought four property portfolios.

References

External links
 Official site
Investment trusts of the United Kingdom
Real estate companies established in 2016
Housing associations based in England